Children of Troubled Times, also known as Fēngyún Érnǚ, Scenes of City Life, Children of the Storm, and several other translations, is a patriotic 1935 Chinese film most famous as the origin of "The March of the Volunteers", the national anthem of the People's Republic of China. The movie was directed by Xu Xingzhi and written by Tian Han and Xia Yan. Yuan Muzhi plays an intellectual who flees the trouble in Shanghai to pursue the glamorous Wang Renmei only to join the Chinese resistance after the death of his friend.

Plot
A young poet Xin Baihe flees Shanghai with his friend, Liang. Liang soon joins the resistance against the Japanese invaders, but Xin chooses to pursue a relationship with a glamorous and westernized widow in Qingdao.

After hearing that Liang has been killed, however, Xin has a change of heart and rushes to join the war effort.

Communist themes
The film was a strong communist production, produced by the Diantong Film Company and based on a story by Tian Han, a Communist Party member since 1932. Tian was arrested by the Nationalists shortly after it was released. In addition, it starred Yuan Muzhi, who would join the Communists in 1940 and had music by the Communist composer Nie Er.

The story itself, with its tale of a wealthy man who learns to abandon the decadence of Western culture for self-sacrifice, was also a common theme among leftist films of the period.

Theme

The theme song of the movie, "The March of the Volunteers", was sung by Gu Menghe and Yuan Muzhi. The song was released as an album by the Pathé Records label (which later became part of EMI in 1935). "The March of the Volunteers" was selected as the provisional national anthem of the People's Republic of China in 1949. This decision was formally written into the Constitution of the People's Republic of China in March 2004.

See also
Cinema of China

Notes

References

External links
 Children of Troubled Times at the Internet Movie Database [erroneously translated as Scenes of City Life]
 Children of Trouble[d] Times at Dianying's Chinese Movie Database
 Children of Troubled Times at the Internet Archive
 

Chinese black-and-white films
1930s Mandarin-language films
1935 films
Second Sino-Japanese War films
Articles containing video clips
Chinese drama films
1935 drama films